Gurab-e Sofla, also known as Gurab-e Pain, may refer to:
 Gurab-e Sofla, Dehloran, Ilam Province
 Gurab-e Sofla, Shirvan and Chardaval, Ilam Province